Steele Road railway station served the hamlet of Steele Road, Scottish Borders, Scotland, from 1862 to 1969 on the Border Union Railway.

History 
The station, situated south of an unnamed road, was opened on 2 June 1862 by the Border Union Railway. The station was served by one train per day until a full timetable was introduced on 1 July. To the south end of the down platform was the signal box. It was damaged in an arson attack on 27 May 1914 and replaced shortly after. Goods traffic ceased on 28 December 1964 and the station was downgraded to an unstaffed halt on 27 March 1967. It closed to passengers on 6 January 1969. Since closure, the station offices and house have been converted into a residential property

In 2007, following his death, the ashes the BAFTA award winning location sound recordist Peter Handford were scattered at the site. Handford had made some of his most well known steam locomotive recordings during days and nights spent at the station.

References 

Disused railway stations in the Scottish Borders
Railway stations in Great Britain opened in 1862
Railway stations in Great Britain closed in 1969
Beeching closures in Scotland
Former North British Railway stations
1862 establishments in Scotland